This is an incomplete List of ghost towns in Nebraska.

 Andrews
 Angora
 Antioch
 Appleton
 Arago
 Armour
 Ashford
 Belmont
 Bluevale
 Bookwalter
 Breslau
 Brewster
 Burton
 Butler
 Cincinnati
 Covington
 De Soto
 DeWitty
 Dobytown
 Duff
 Dunwell
 Elvira
 Factoryville
 Friedensau
 Glen
 Gross (near ghost town)
 Hayland
 Hecla
 Homerville
 Hope
 Jacksonville
 Jamaica
 Koesterville
 Lakeland
 Lee Park
 Lemoyne
 Linton
 Macy
 Mariaville
 Mars
 Marsland
 Martha
 Mayberry
 Meadville
 Melrose
 Meridian
 Minersville
 Mission Creek
 Monowi (near ghost town)
 Montrose
 Mud Springs
 Neapolis
 New Home
 Nonpareil
 North Summerfield
 Omadi
 Pauline
 Pischelville
 Pittsburg
 Pleasant Hill
 Pleasant Valley
 Rock Bluff 
 Royal
 Saltillo
 Sartoria
 Scott's Valley
 Schafferville
 Sedan
 Speiser
 Spring Ranche
 St. Deroin
 Tate
 Tipp's Branch
 Unit
 Violet
  Wee
 Weissert

Notes and references

 
Nebraska
Ghost towns